Porfirio Alejandro Muñoz Ledo y Lazo de la Vega (born July 23, 1933 in Mexico City) is a Mexican politician.  He is one of the founders of the Party of the Democratic Revolution (PRD). He is the current Mexican Ambassador to Cuba since January 2022.

Biography
Muñoz Ledo studied law at the National Autonomous University of Mexico (UNAM) from 1951 to 1955 and later pursued graduate studies at the University of Paris.

He served as a member of the cabinets of presidents Luis Echeverría as Secretary of Labor (1972–1975); and José López Portillo  as Secretary of Education (1976–1977). He was President of the Institutional Revolutionary Party (PRI) during the presidential campaign of 1975–1976.

Muñoz Ledo was Mexican Ambassador to the United Nations (1978–1985), where he presided the UN Security Council, the Group of 77 and the negotiations of the Global Economic Agreements.

In 1988 he broke with the PRI and won a seat in the Senate running as a candidate for the leftist Frente Democrático Nacional (FDN) coalition.  The following year (May 5, 1989), Muñoz Ledo, Cuauhtémoc Cárdenas and other leading center-left and leftist politicians formally founded the Party of the Democratic Revolution (PRD).

Muñoz Ledo served in the Chamber of Deputies from 1997 to 1999. He was the first member of an opposition party to preside Congress in the post-revolutionary period as President of the Chamber of Deputies in 1997. He ran for the presidency in 2000 as the Authentic Party of the Mexican Revolution candidate but before the elections he gave his support to the National Action Party candidate Vicente Fox who later designated Muñoz Ledo ambassador to the European Union (2001–2004).

In 2005 he returned to the PRD to join Andrés Manuel López Obrador in his presidential campaign.

In 2009 until 2012, he again served in the Mexican Chamber of Deputies as a Deputy for the PT.

On August 27, 2018, the parliamentary group of the National Regeneration Movement (MORENA) proposed him as president of the Chamber of Deputies and therefore of the Congress of the Union for the first year of the LXIV Legislature.

In late 2020, he ran for president of the MORENA party, but came in second place. In January 2022, he was appointed as Mexican Ambassador to Cuba.

References

Further reading
Camp, Roderic Ai. "Porfirio Muñoz Ledo" in Mexican Political Biographies. Second edition. Tucson: University of Arizona 1982, pp. 211–12. 
Gil, Carlos B. ed. Hope and Frustration: Interviews with Leaders of Mexico's Political Opposition, especially Chapter 7, "Porfirio Muñoz Ledo". Wilmington: Scholarly Resources Books 1992. 

1933 births
Living people
Mexican Secretaries of Labor
Mexican Secretaries of Education
Presidents of the Chamber of Deputies (Mexico)
20th-century Mexican lawyers
Candidates in the 2000 Mexican presidential election
Members of the Senate of the Republic (Mexico)
Presidents of the Party of the Democratic Revolution
Presidents of the Institutional Revolutionary Party
People from Mexico City
National Autonomous University of Mexico alumni
University of Paris alumni
Ambassadors of Mexico to the European Union
Permanent Representatives of Mexico to the United Nations
Authentic Party of the Mexican Revolution politicians
21st-century Mexican politicians
Members of the Constituent Assembly of Mexico City
Morena (political party) politicians
Deputies of the LXIV Legislature of Mexico
20th-century Mexican politicians
Deputies of the LVII Legislature of Mexico
Deputies of the LXI Legislature of Mexico
Members of the Chamber of Deputies (Mexico) for Mexico City